White Eyes Township is one of the twenty-two townships of Coshocton County, Ohio, United States. As of the 2010 census the population was 1,194.

Geography
Located in the northeastern part of the county, it borders the following townships:
Crawford Township - north
Bucks Township, Tuscarawas County - northeast corner
Adams Township - east
Oxford Township - southeast corner
Lafayette Township - south
Tuscarawas Township - southwest corner
Keene Township - west
Mill Creek Township - northwest corner

No municipalities are located in White Eyes Township, although the unincorporated community of Fresno lies in the eastern part of the township.

Name and history
White Eyes Township was organized in 1823. It was named for White Eyes, a Lenape (Delaware) chief who lived in the Tuscarawas valley.

It is the only White Eyes Township statewide.

Government
The township is governed by a three-member board of trustees, who are elected in November of odd-numbered years to a four-year term beginning on the following January 1. Two are elected in the year after the presidential election and one is elected in the year before it. There is also an elected township fiscal officer, who serves a four-year term beginning on April 1 of the year after the election, which is held in November of the year before the presidential election. Vacancies in the fiscal officership or on the board of trustees are filled by the remaining trustees.

References

External links
County website

Townships in Coshocton County, Ohio
Townships in Ohio